Rural Sociology is a quarterly peer-reviewed academic journal covering rural sociology. It was established in 1936 and is the official journal of the Rural Sociological Society. It is published by John Wiley & Sons and the editor-in-chief is Carol J. Ward (Brigham Young University). According to the Journal Citation Reports, the journal has a 2020 impact factor of 4.078, ranking it 17th out of 149 journals in the category "Sociology".

References

External links

Sociology journals
Publications established in 1936
Quarterly journals
Wiley (publisher) academic journals
English-language journals
Academic journals associated with learned and professional societies of the United States
Rural sociology